This is a list of marae (Māori meeting grounds) in the Marlborough Region.

List of marae

See also
 Lists of marae in New Zealand
 List of marae in Nelson, New Zealand
 List of marae in the Canterbury Region
 List of schools in the Marlborough Region

References

Marlborough Region, List of marae in the
Marae
Marae in the Marlborough Region, List of